Terry Ray Gordy Sr. (April 23, 1961 – July 16, 2001) was an American professional wrestler. Gordy appeared in the United States with promotions such as Mid-South Wrestling, Georgia Championship Wrestling, World Class Championship Wrestling, Jim Crockett Promotions/World Championship Wrestling and the Universal Wrestling Federation as a member of The Fabulous Freebirds. He also appeared in Japan with All Japan Pro Wrestling as one-half of The Miracle Violence Connection.

Gordy held many championships throughout the course of his career, including the Triple Crown Heavyweight Championship, AJPW World Tag Team Championship, WCW World Tag Team Championship, NWA World Tag Team Championship, UWF Heavyweight Championship and SMW Heavyweight Championship. He has been posthumously inducted into the Wrestling Observer, Professional Wrestling, and WWE Hall of Fame.

Professional wrestling career

Early career (1975–1982) 
Gordy was a standout high school football and baseball player at Rossville High School, but dropped out of high school following his freshman year. Trained by Archie Gouldie, he started wrestling at the age of 13 in 1974 as Terry Mecca for the International Wrestling Association. In early 1979, he began wrestling under his real name and formed The Fabulous Freebirds with Michael Hayes, with Buddy Roberts later added to the group. Gordy and Hayes had met while training in Mississippi the year prior. In 1980, the Freebirds moved to Georgia Championship Wrestling, where they won the territory’s tag team championship. The Fabulous Freebirds had feuds while there, including those against Tommy Rich, Junkyard Dog, Kevin Sullivan, Austin Idol, and Ted DiBiase, and became one of the first acts to use entrance music. One match on the Saturday night WTBS Georgia Championship Wrestling show saw the Freebirds take on the Junkyard Dog and Ted DiBiase, where towards the end of the match, Gordy gave DiBiase 4 consecutive piledrivers, which led to DiBiase being taken away in an ambulance. In 1981, the Freebirds split up when Buddy Roberts left the area. Michael and Terry then had a falling out, which led to a feud against each other. Terry and Michael eventually put their differences aside, and reformed the Freebirds as a duo in 1982 when they feuded with Ole Anderson and Stan Hansen.

World Class Championship Wrestling (1982–1989) 
In 1982, the Freebirds went to World Class Championship Wrestling and had a feud with the Von Erichs (David, Kevin, Kerry and Mike), which kicked off when Gordy slammed the cage door on Kerry during his cage match on March 15 at WCCW Star Wars against Ric Flair, where Michael Hayes served as the special guest referee, inciting a riot among fans attending. They traded the six man title back and forth a few times over the years. Gordy was also at one time one half of the WCCW American Tag Team Champions. While in WCCW, Killer Khan taught Gordy how to perform the Oriental Spike, which he dubbed the Asiatic Spike.

All Japan Pro Wrestling (1983–1994) 
Gordy teamed with Stan Hansen beginning in 1983 in All Japan Pro Wrestling. Gordy later teamed with Steve Williams as The Miracle Violence Connection. During his time there, he also held the Triple Crown Heavyweight Championship on two occasions.

World Wrestling Federation (1984) 
The Freebirds spent a brief time in the World Wrestling Federation in 1984, but were fired after missing a show and showing up late and drunk.

Universal Wrestling Federation (1986)
In 1986, when the Freebirds were in Universal Wrestling Federation, the former Mid South Wrestling, Gordy became the first person to win the UWF Heavyweight Championship and held it for six months, before losing it via forfeit to the One Man Gang, after an angle the same night in which Gordy was injured in an auto accident by "Dr. Death" Steve Williams, whom he feuded with. During this time, Gordy and the Freebirds had an ongoing feud with Hacksaw Jim Duggan, in which Duggan and Gordy squared off, usually ending in a disqualification because of outside interference.

Jim Crockett Promotions/NWA World Championship Wrestling (1987, 1989, 1992) 
The Freebirds spent some time in the National Wrestling Alliance's Jim Crockett Promotions where they split to feud briefly, but later reunited. In 1989, Gordy helped Hayes to reform the Freebirds, with Jimmy Garvin, in the NWA, which became World Championship Wrestling in 1991. Later, he and Steve Williams defeated the Steiners to become World Tag Team Champions.

Gordy and Williams returned to World Championship Wrestling (WCW) in 1992 and won the WCW World Tag Team titles. At that point, they were considered the most dominant team in wrestling, making $10,000 to $15,000 a week. They also won the NWA World Tag Team titles in a tournament at the Great American Bash card in Albany, Georgia, one week later, and unified the titles. Their feud with Rick and Scott Steiner in Japan was hyped as a feud between the best foreign teams of the two top Japanese promotions (the Steiners were competing for rival New Japan Pro-Wrestling at the time). Despite advances by New Japan, Gordy and Williams, out of loyalty to the AJPW founder and promoter, Giant Baba, refused to compete for the promotion (which had business ties with WCW at the time), leading to Gordy's departure from WCW before Halloween Havoc and Williams' departure after Starrcade. 

On August 18, 1993, while traveling from the United States to Japan for a tour, Gordy took an overdose (from which he almost died of three years earlier) of pain medication and slipped into a five-day coma, ultimately suffering permanent brain damage. As a result, he had to relearn how to talk, walk, and wrestle. He returned to action later that year, but never received a shot at the Triple Crown again or possessed the skills he once had. In 1994, Gordy had a small reunion with Hayes and Garvin as the Freebirds in the Global Wrestling Federation where he and Garvin won the GWF Tag Team Titles.

Various promotions (1989-1995)
After World Class folded in 1989, Gordy wrestled in various promotions. He started working for United States Wrestling Association (USWA). In 1991, he worked for Universal Wrestling Federation where he feuded with Don Muraco. In 1994, he reunited with The Freebirds (Michael Hayes and Jimmy Garvin) for Global Wrestling Federation in Texas where they feuded with Bill Irwin, Black Bart and Moadib. Gordy returned to USWA in 1995, where he teamed with Tracy Smothers.

Smoky Mountain Wrestling (1995) 
In 1995, Gordy worked for Smoky Mountain Wrestling, teaming with Tommy Rich as the Militia. Gordy won the SMW Heavyweight Championship by defeating Brad Armstrong when he teamed with Thrasher to defeat Armstrong and the Wolfman on October 27. A month later, he dropped the title back to Armstrong in a Country whipping match.

Extreme Championship Wrestling (1996) 
In 1996, Gordy appeared in Extreme Championship Wrestling to challenge Raven for the ECW World Heavyweight title, as the "internationally recognized #1 contender". He had been working for the International Wrestling Association of Japan promotion, wrestling deathmatches. He lost, but went on to team up with Tommy Dreamer and later to reunite with "Dr. Death" Steve Williams to wrestle The Eliminators. He also wrestled Bam Bam Bigelow at Ultimate Jeopardy in what was billed as the second ever "Battle Of The Bam Bams" (The first happened on a Windy City Wrestling show), which he lost due to outside interference from The Eliminators.

Return to World Wrestling Federation (1996–1997, 1998) 
Gordy had a brief run in the WWF as The Executioner in 1996 and 1997, where he teamed up with Mankind, both managed by Paul Bearer, and feuded with The Undertaker. The Executioner came to the ring under a mask and carrying an axe as Bearer's "hired assassin". He made his TV debut at the In Your House pay-per-view Buried Alive on October 20, 1996, where he interfered in The Undertaker's Buried Alive match with Mankind, hitting Undertaker with a shovel and burying him with the help of Mankind and several other wrestlers. However, at In Your House 12: It's Time on December 15, The Undertaker defeated The Executioner in an Armageddon Rules match, and Gordy left the promotion shortly afterwards. 

On an episode of Something to Wrestle With, Bruce Prichard claimed that the Executioner gimmick was given to Gordy because McMahon had doubts that Gordy could still compete effectively and the use of a mask was intended to protect Gordy so that if that were the case, Gordy's legacy would not be tainted. Had Gordy been able to compete at a high level then there would have been the opportunity later for Gordy to unmask. It was mentioned that the hiring was mostly done as a favor for Michael Hayes.

Later career (1998–2001) 
After leaving the WWF and Japan, Gordy worked in the independent circuit. On February 21, 1998, Gordy teamed with Dan Severn in a losing effort to Doug Gilbert and Dutch Mantel at the Eddie Gilbert Memorial Show for IWA Mid-South. Gordy would reunite with Hayes as they fought Glen Kulka and JR Smooth to a no contest for Power Pro Wrestling on May 28, 1999. He wrestled his last match returning to IWA Japan on February 4, 2001 with Shoichi Ichimiya, Tomohiro Ishii, Yukihide Ueno, and Yuji Kito, defeating Doug Gilbert, TJ Shinjuku, Ultra Sebun, Takashi Uwano and Keizo Mastuda.

Personal life 
Gordy had two daughters and a son, Ray Gordy, who wrestled for WWE as "Jesse" and "Slam Master J" before being released in 2010. His nephew is Richard Aslinger, who competed for All Japan Pro Wrestling as Richard Slinger. His daughter Miranda currently wrestles on the independent circuit and has also competed in Japan. He was known for his "high octane, southern lifestyle" outside of the ring.

Death and legacy 
Gordy was found dead by his girlfriend at his home in Soddy-Daisy, Tennessee on July 16, 2001, after suffering a heart attack caused by a blood clot. He was 40 years old. 

Following his death, the Terry Gordy Memorial Show was held in his honor on August 11 in Birmingham, Alabama. Various wrestlers including Fabulous Freebirds cohort Michael Hayes and former tag team partner Stan Hansen praised Gordy for being one of the best workers they ever worked with. In 2014, he was posthumously inducted into the Southern Wrestling Hall of Fame. A year later, he was also posthumously inducted into the Professional Wrestling Hall of Fame and Museum. On April 2, 2016, Gordy was posthumously inducted by his son into the WWE Hall of Fame as part of the Fabulous Freebirds.

Championships and accomplishments

All Japan Pro Wrestling
Triple Crown Heavyweight Championship (2 times)
World Tag Team Championship (7 times) – with Stan Hansen (2) and Steve Williams (5)
World's Strongest Tag Determination League (1988, 1990, 1991) – with Stan Hansen (1988) and Steve Williams (1990 and 1991)
World's Strongest Tag Determination League Fighting Spirit Award (1989) – with Bill Irwin
Georgia Championship Wrestling
NWA Georgia Tag Team Championship (1 time) – with Michael Hayes
NWA National Tag Team Championship (4 times) – with Michael Hayes (3) and Jimmy Snuka (1)
Global Wrestling Federation
GWF Tag Team Championship (1 time) – with Jimmy Garvin
Mid-South Wrestling Association | Universal Wrestling Federation
Mid-South Louisiana Championship (1 time)
Mid-South Mississippi Heavyweight Championship (1 time)
Mid-South Tag Team Championship (2 times) – with Michael Hayes (1) and Buddy Roberts
UWF Heavyweight Championship (1 time)
UWF Heavyweight Championship Tournament (1986)
NWA Mid-America
NWA Mid-America Tag Team Championship (2 times) – with Michael Hayes
Professional Wrestling Hall of Fame 
Class of 2015 as a member of The Fabulous Freebirds
Pro Wrestling Illustrated
Most Improved Wrestler of the Year (1986)
Tag Team of the Year (1981) – with Michael Hayes
Tag Team of the Year (1992) – with Steve Williams
Ranked No. 31 of the top 500 singles wrestlers in the PWI 500 in 1992
Ranked No. 36 of the top 500 singles wrestlers of the "PWI Years" in 2003
Ranked No. 3, 16, and 34 of the top 100 tag teams of the "PWI Years" with Michael Hayes, Steve Williams, and Stan Hansen, respectively, in 2003
Southeastern Championship Wrestling
NWA Alabama Heavyweight Championship (1 time)
NWA Southeastern Heavyweight Championship (Northern Division) (1 time)
Smoky Mountain Wrestling
SMW Heavyweight Championship (1 time)
Texas Wrestling Hall of Fame
Class of 2014
World Championship Wrestling
WCW World Tag Team Championship (1 time) – with Steve Williams
NWA World Tag Team Championship (1 time) – with Steve Williams
 NWA World Tag Team Championship Tournament (1992) – Steve Williams
World Class Championship Wrestling | World Class Wrestling Association
NWA American Heavyweight Championship (1 time)
NWA American Tag Team Championship (1 time) – with Michael Hayes
NWA Brass Knuckles Championship (Texas version) (1 time)
NWA World Six-Man Tag Team Championship (Texas version) (6 times) – with Michael Hayes & Buddy Roberts (5) and Iceman Parsons & Buddy Roberts (1)
WCWA World Six-Man Tag Team Championship (1 time) – with Michael Hayes & Buddy Roberts 2
 WWE
 WWE Hall of Fame (Class of 2016) – as a member of The Fabulous Freebirds
Wrestling Observer Newsletter
Best Brawler (1986)
Match of the Year (1984) with Buddy Roberts and Michael Hayes vs. the Von Erichs (Kerry, Kevin, and Mike) in an Anything Goes match on July 4
Best Three-Man Team (1983) with Michael Hayes & Buddy Roberts
Tag Team of the Year (1980) with Buddy Roberts as The Fabulous Freebirds
Tag Team of the Year (1981) with Jimmy Snuka
Tag Team of the Year (1992) with Steve Williams as The Miracle Violence Connection
Wrestling Observer Newsletter Hall of Fame (Class of 2005) – as part of The Fabulous Freebirds
1Won while WCW was still affiliated with the National Wrestling Alliance and prior to the NWA and WCW World Tag Team Championships being briefly unified.
2The Freebirds' 5th reign carried over after the title's name was changed to the WCWA World Six-Man Tag Team Championship since they were the champions at the time the title was renamed.

See also 
 List of premature professional wrestling deaths

References

External links 
 
 
 

1961 births
2001 deaths
American male professional wrestlers
Expatriate professional wrestlers in Japan
Professional wrestlers from Tennessee
Professional Wrestling Hall of Fame and Museum
Sportspeople from Chattanooga, Tennessee
WWE Hall of Fame inductees
20th-century professional wrestlers
World Tag Team Champions (AJPW)
Triple Crown Heavyweight Champions
SMW Heavyweight Champions
WCWA Brass Knuckles Champions
WCW World Tag Team Champions
NWA Georgia Tag Team Champions
NWA National Tag Team Champions